The lyrate rocksnail, scientific name †Leptoxis lirata, was a species of freshwater snail with a gill and an operculum, an aquatic gastropod mollusk in the family Pleuroceridae.

This species was endemic to the United States. It is now extinct.

References

Leptoxis
Extinct gastropods
Gastropods described in 1922
Taxonomy articles created by Polbot